Velereč is a village in Gornji Milanovac municipality of Serbia, located at . In the 2002 census, it had 565 residents.

References 

Populated places in Moravica District